Nikola Otašević (born January 25, 1982) is a former Serbian professional basketball player.

Career 
On June 30, 2019, Otašević announced his retirement from playing career.

Career statistics

Eurocup

|-
| style="text-align:left;"| 2006-07
| style="text-align:left;"| Scandone Avellino
| 6 || 1 || 13.0 || .615 || .600 || .778 || 1.0 || 2.3 || 1.7 || 0.0 || 4.3 || 6.8
|-
| style="text-align:left;"| 2007–08
| style="text-align:left;"| Budućnost Podgorica
| 13 || 2 || 20.4 || .368 || .250 || .806 || 1.3 || 3.7 || 1.9 || 0.0 || 6.0 || 5.7
|-
| style="text-align:left;"| 2008-09
| style="text-align:left;"| Budućnost Podgorica
| 5 || 0 || 19.0 || .429 || .600 || .583 || 2.8 || 1.4 || 0.8 || 0.0 || 4.4 || 3.8
|-
| style="text-align:left;"| 2011–12
| style="text-align:left;"| Budućnost Podgorica
| 6 || 0 || 16.2 || .389 || .333 || .1000 || 1.7 || 2.3 || 1.3 || 0.0 || 3.0 || 2.7
|-
| style="text-align:left;"| 2013–14
| style="text-align:left;"| MZT Skopje
| 7 || 7 || 22.0 || .452 || .200 || .1000 || 2.0 || 3.1 || 0.9 || 0.0 || 4.6 || 3.1
|- class="sortbottom"
| style="text-align:left;"| Career
| style="text-align:left;"|
| 37 || 10 || 18.0 || .421 || .326 || .768 || 1.6 || 2.8 || 1.4 || 0.0 || 4.7 || 4.4

References

External links
 Nikola Otašević at aba-liga.com
 Nikola Otašević at euroleague.net

1982 births
Living people
ABA League players
Basketball League of Serbia players
KK Beopetrol/Atlas Beograd players
KK Budućnost players
KK Ergonom players
KK Hemofarm players
KK Metalac Valjevo players
KK MZT Skopje players
KK Sloboda Užice players
KK Włocławek players
KK Zdravlje players
OKK Beograd players
Point guards
Serbian expatriate basketball people in Montenegro
Serbian expatriate basketball people in Poland
Serbian expatriate basketball people in North Macedonia
Serbian expatriate basketball people in Romania
Serbian men's basketball players
Sportspeople from Užice